Axis & Allies: Guadalcanal, released in 2007, is the fifth spinoff board game of the Axis & Allies series of games, focusing on the Solomon Islands Campaign. Like the rest of the games in the series, it was created by Larry Harris and published by Avalon Hill. This game is of a personal significance to Harris, as explained in the game's manual, since his father had been stationed at Guadalcanal, the setting of this game.

References

External links
Axis & Allies: Guadalcanal web page

Avalon Hill games
Axis & Allies
Board games introduced in 2007
Larry Harris (game designer) games
World War II board wargames